Polypera simushirae is a species of snailfish native to the northwestern Pacific Ocean where it is found at depths down to . This species is the only known member of its genus. It is probably, the largest of the snailfishes.

References

Liparidae
Monotypic fish genera
Fish described in 1912